Chile competed at the 1972 Summer Olympics in Munich, West Germany. Eleven competitors, nine men and two women, took part in nine events in five sports.

Athletics

Men's 5000 meters
Edmundo Warnke
 Heat — 13:43.6 (→ did not advance)

Boxing

Men's Flyweight (– 51 kg)
 Martín Vargas
 First Round — Bye
 Second Round — Lost to Calixto Perez (COL), 0:5

Equestrian

Rowing

Men's Single Sculls
Rodmanis Janis
Heat — 8:23.38
Repechage — 8:29.66 (→ did not advance)

Shooting

Two male shooters represented Chile in 1972.

Skeet
 Jorge Uauy
 Antonio Yaqigi

References

External links
Official Olympic Reports

Nations at the 1972 Summer Olympics
1972 Summer Olympics
1972 in Chilean sport